America's Voice may refer to:

America's Voice (cable network) (National Empowerment Television), a now-defunct cable TV network designed to rapidly mobilize conservative followers for grassroots lobbying
America's Voice (lobby), a liberal immigration reform group

See also
Voice of America (disambiguation)